Richard John Conner (13 August 1931 – May 1999) was an English football player and manager. He played as wing half for Newcastle United, South Shields, Grimsby Town, Southampton, Tranmere Rovers and Aldershot. He went on to manage Aldershot as caretaker, Rochdale and Darlington.

References

External links 

1931 births
1999 deaths
Sportspeople from Jarrow
Footballers from Tyne and Wear
English footballers
Association football wing halves
Newcastle United F.C. players
South Shields F.C. (1936) players
Grimsby Town F.C. players
Southampton F.C. players
Tranmere Rovers F.C. players
Aldershot F.C. players
English Football League players
English football managers
Aldershot F.C. managers
Rochdale A.F.C. managers
Darlington F.C. managers
English Football League managers
Grimsby Town F.C. non-playing staff